Asaccus andersoni is a species of leaf-toed gecko endemic to Iran, on the western slopes of the central Zagros Mountains. It lives in on rocks in gullies of mountainous oak forests. It is named in honor of Steven Clement Anderson, in recognition of "his major contributions to the knowledge of the herpetofauna of the Middle East and the Iranian Plateau in particular".

At the type locality, Asaccus andersoni occurred with several other species of lizards and snakes, including Asaccus elisae, Laudakia nupta, Ophisops elegans, and Platyceps najadum.

References

Asaccus
Reptiles of Iran
Endemic fauna of Iran
Reptiles described in 2011